Shorty the Pimp is the seventh studio album by American rapper Too Short, released on July 14, 1992, by Jive Records. Five songs were produced by Ant Banks, four by Too Short himself and one song by D'wayne Wiggins.

The album title is from the 1973 blaxploitation film of the same name, featuring a character of that name. The first track samples the theme song of the film; the soundtrack of the film was later collected in the funk album Shorty the Pimp by Don Julian & The Larks (who star in the movie). This album debuted at number 6 on the US Billboard 200 chart with 82,000 copies sold in its first week.

Track listing

Samples credit
"Intro: Shorty the Pimp" - Contains a sample of "Shorty the Pimp" by Don Julian
"In the Trunk" - Contains a sample of "I'm Gonna Love You Just a Little More Baby" by Barry White
"Ain't Nothing But a Dog" - Contains sample of "Slow Dance" by Stanley Clarke and "Cannot Find a Way" by Curtis Mayfield
"Hoes" - Contains a sample of "Take Your Dead Ass Home! (Say Som'n Nasty)" by Funkadelic
"No Love from Oakland" - Contains a sample of "The Night of the Thumpasorus Peoples" by Parliament
"I Want to Be Free (That's the Truth)" - Contains a sample of "Sweet Music, Soft Lights & You" by Millie Jackson and Isaac Hayes, "House of Rising Funk" by Afrique and "I Want to Be Free" by Ohio Players
"Step Daddy" - Contains a sample of "Agony of Defeet" by Parliament
"It Don't Stop" - Contains a sample of "Pack It Up" by Ohio Players
"So You Want to Be a Gangster" - Contains a sample of "Black Frost" by Grover Washington, Jr.
"Extra Dangerous Thanks" - Contains a sample of "Magnificent Sanctuary Band" by Donny Hathaway

Charts

In popular culture
The second track "In the Trunk" can be heard in the opening scenes of the 2018 Marvel Comics film Black Panther.
The tenth track “So You Want To Be A Gangster” is featured In the video game Grand Theft Auto V on the in game radio station “West Coast Classics”.

References

Too Short albums
1992 albums
Albums produced by Ant Banks
Jive Records albums